Taantumus is the tenth album by the Finnish experimental rock band Circle.

First released on CD in 2001 by Bad Vugum, it was re-released by Ektro Records in 2009 with an extra track.

Track listing
 "Kultaa" (4:27)
 "Kekkone" (5:31)
 "Valtaisa Hahmo" (4:44)
 "Traktors" (7:47)
 "Suopea" (4:33)
 "Rautasilta" (6:42)
 "Lyhytaallosta" (4:28)
 "Ranta" (0:35)
 "Morn" (5:32)
 "Siivet" (3.34)
 "Taantumus" (6:14)
 "Pelqton" (7:37)
 "Veitsi" (9:21) (Bonus track on 2009 re-issue)

Personnel
Teemu Elo
Pike Kontkanen - violin on "Kekkone" and "Traktors"
Jyrki Laiho
Jussi Lehtisalo - bass guitar, guitar
Tomi Leppänen - percussion
Teemu Niemelä
Janne Peltomäki
Mika Rättö - keyboards on "Valtaisa hahmo", "Siivet" and "Pelqton"
Markku Peltola - harmonica on "Morn"
Mika Rintala - signal processing on "Kekkone" and "Rautasilta"
Heidi Viljanen - vocals on "Suopea"
Aki Peltonen - guitar on "Kultaa"
Tapani Varis - flute on "Valtaisa hahmo"

Circle (band) albums
2001 albums